The Rt Revd Michel Hrynchyshyn C.Ss.R. (18 February 1929 – 12 November  2012) was the apostolic exarch of the Apostolic Exarchate in France, Benelux and Switzerland for the Ukrainians from when he was consecrated bishop on 30 January 1983 until his resignation in 2012. He was appointed by Pope John Paul II on 21 October 1982. He also was an advisor to the Congregation for the Oriental Churches and a member of Le conseil d'Eglises chrétiennes en France (CECEF). Hrynchyshyn was born in Buchanan, Saskatchewan.

References

External links

Canadian members of the Ukrainian Greek Catholic Church
Bishops of the Ukrainian Greek Catholic Church
1929 births
2012 deaths
Redemptorist bishops
Canadian bishops
Canadian people of Ukrainian descent
French people of Canadian descent
French people of Ukrainian descent
People from Buchanan, Saskatchewan
20th-century Eastern Catholic bishops
21st-century Eastern Catholic bishops